The style and title of the Canadian sovereign is the formal mode of address of the monarch of Canada. The form is based on those that were inherited from the United Kingdom and France, used in the colonies to refer to the reigning monarch in Europe. As various Canadian territories changed ownership and then the country gradually gained independence, the style and title of the monarchs changed almost as often as the kings and queens themselves. The mode of address currently employed is a combination of a style that originates in the early 17th century and a title established by Canadian law in 1953.

Current style and titles

In 1953, a year after the accession to the throne of Queen Elizabeth II, the Canadian parliament passed the Royal Style and Titles Act (R.S.C., 1985, c. R-12), providing for the parliament's consent to the issuance of a royal proclamation changing the monarch's title being then used. The relevant royal proclamation was issued on May 28, just days before her coronation. As of the accession of Charles III in 2022, the sovereign's style and titles in Canada are, in English:

And in French:

The style and titles were composed during the reign of Elizabeth II to distinctly mention Canada so as to highlight the monarch's shared status, being both monarch of Canada and, separately, of the United Kingdom, as well as the six (today 13) other Commonwealth realms; with emphasis showing the distinct title Queen (now King) of Canada as embedded in the longer formal title. When composed for Elizabeth II in 1953, this format was consistent with the monarch's titles in her other realms. Only Canada retains this title; all others, aside from the UK itself, removed the reference to the United Kingdom.

The monarch is typically addressed by the title King of Canada and is expected to allude to himself as King of Canada when in or acting abroad on behalf of that country. For example, Elizabeth II said in 1973: "...it is as Queen of Canada that I am here, Queen of Canada and of all Canadians, not just of one or two ancestral strains." Since the title was adopted, the federal government has promoted its use as a signifier of Canada's sovereign and independent status; Prime Minister John Diefenbaker said of the title in 1957: "The Queen of Canada is a term which we like to use because it utterly represents her role on this occasion." The title is also included in the Oath of Allegiance, which forms a part of the Oath of Citizenship, and can be found as —Latin for Elizabeth II by the Grace of God Queen, Canada—on the obverse of various medals in the Canadian honours system; this wording is expected to change in light of the accession of Charles III.

Although the King's Canadian titles include Defender of the Faith/, neither the monarch nor any of the viceroys have an official religious role in Canada. Unlike in the United Kingdom, where the term (in Latin) signifies the sovereign's position as Supreme Governor of the Church of England and a member and defender of the security of the Church of Scotland, there have been no established churches in Canada since before its confederation in 1867. Defender of the Faith thus has a more vague meaning in the Canadian title, alluding only to the monarch's belief in a higher power. Prime Minister Louis St. Laurent stated on this matter in his 1953 contribution to the debate on the Royal Style and Titles Act in the House of Commons: "The rather more delicate question arose about the retention of the words defender of the faith... In our countries [Canada and the other non-British monarchies of the Commonwealth] there are no established churches, but in our countries there are people who have faith in the direction of human affairs by an all-wise Providence; and we felt that it was a good thing that the civil authorities would proclaim that their organization is such that it is a defence of the continued beliefs in a supreme power that orders the affairs of mere men, and that there could be no reasonable objection from anyone who believed in the Supreme Being in having the sovereign, the head of the civil authority, described as a believer in and a defender of the faith in a supreme ruler."

Also, while the sovereign holds the nominal title Head of the Commonwealth, this does not imply any political power over member states of the Commonwealth of Nations. In keeping, however, with the declaration of the prime ministers of the Commonwealth in London in 1949 of "the King as the symbol of the free association of its independent member nations and as such the Head of the Commonwealth," the title will pass to the next monarch upon the demise of the Crown and in fact did so in 2022, though any future change is not a guaranteed certainty.

Style of address

The use of the styles of address Highness and Majesty originated in the United Kingdom, where they were used from the 12th century onward. During the reign of James VI of Scotland and I of England and Ireland, however, Majesty became the official style, to the exclusion of all others, and it was then brought to North America during colonial times through usage in reference to the British monarch, who then had sovereignty over the colonies on that continent. Its usage has continued since Canada became a kingdom in its own right in 1867, and after a process of constitutional evolution ending with full sovereignty from the United Kingdom, is now applied to the Canadian monarch. Unlike in the United Kingdom, where the sovereign is referred to in treaties and on British passports as His [Her] Britannic Majesty, the sovereign in Canada is referred to simply as His [Her] Majesty. However, from time to time, the style will be His [Her] Canadian Majesty so as to differentiate from foreign sovereigns. Canadian styles of address are officially maintained by the Department of Canadian Heritage's Protocol Office.

History
Following Canadian Confederation, Prime Minister of Canada John A. Macdonald, having been denied the name Kingdom of Canada for the new country, was repeatedly heard to refer to Queen Victoria as the Queen of Canada, and, similarly, in the lead up to the coronation of King Edward VII in 1902, Prime Minister Wilfrid Laurier desired to have the words King of Canada included in the royal title by the time of the ceremony. This wish was not fulfilled, however, and Canada inherited the full British title when the country gained legislative independence from the United Kingdom in 1931.

Liberal Member of Parliament Eugène Marquis in 1945 tabled a motion in the House of Commons proposing that a change to the King's title be a subject of discussion at the next Commonwealth Prime Ministers' Conference; Marquis suggested that the title include each of the King's dominions, giving him the designation King of Canada. But, the motion did not pass and it was only in 1948 that form of address changed, when the Canadian parliament passed in 1947 its own Royal Style and Titles Act and an Order in Council was issued on 22 June the following year to remove the term Emperor of India from the sovereign's Canadian title. In 1949, it was suggested by Cabinet that the King's title be altered so that in Canada it would be George the Sixth, by the Grace of God, of Canada and the other nations of the British Commonwealth, King; but, again, nothing came of the proposal. At the time, Robert Gordon Robertson, then a member of the Cabinet Secretariat, opined that Canadians would not like the title King of Canada, as "most Canadians... have not thought of themselves as citizens of either a republic or a monarchy." Still, in 1950, when William Ferdinand Alphonse Turgeon was sent to Ireland as Canada's ambassador to that country, the Cabinet wished to have George VI referred to in the letters of credence as King of Canada. The King's secretaries objected strongly, claiming the monarch had only one title in law and Turgeon's letters eventually used George's full legal title, which referred to him as sovereign of Great Britain and "Ireland."

The proclamations of Elizabeth II's accession to the throne in February 1952 differed between Canada and the United Kingdom; in the latter, the new queen was referred to unconventionally as Queen Elizabeth II by the Grace of God, Queen of this Realm, and of Her other Realms and Territories, while the Canadian Privy Council adhered to the letter of the law, calling the sovereign Elizabeth the Second by the Grace of God, of Great Britain, Ireland and the British Dominions beyond the Seas. The discrepancies between independent countries sharing one person as sovereign prompted discussions amongst the Commonwealth prime ministers before a meeting in London, England, in December 1952; Canada's then prime minister, Louis St. Laurent, stated that it was important a new composition for the royal title be agreed upon by all realms involved, to "emphasise the fact that the Queen is Queen of Canada, regardless of her sovereignty over other Commonwealth countries." Canada's preferred format was: Elizabeth the Second, by the Grace of God, Queen of Canada and of Her other realms and territories, Head of the Commonwealth, Defender of the Faith; the Canadian government preferred to keep the word "queen" next to "Canada", as it made the sovereign's role as monarch of Canada more clear than having "queen" follow several words on after the country's name. However, as Australian ministers wished to have the United Kingdom mentioned in all the Queen's titles, the resolution reached was a designation that included the United Kingdom as well as, for the first time, reference to Canada and the other Commonwealth realms separately.

When the Royal Style and Titles Act of 1953 was debated in the House of Commons, St. Laurent asserted on the nature of the separate and shared characteristics of the Crown: "Her Majesty is now Queen of Canada but she is the Queen of Canada because she is Queen of the United Kingdom... It is not a separate office." Parliament then unanimously passed the new legislation consenting to the issuance of a royal proclamation establishing the monarch's royal titles. The relevant royal proclamation establishing the titles was issued on May 28, just four days before Elizabeth II was crowned. The new legislation conferred publicly and legally the reality of a unique constitutional monarchy for Canada, thereby fulfilling the vision of the Fathers of Confederation.

The royal style and titles of Canadian sovereigns

See also
 Style of the British sovereign
 Style of the French sovereign

References

External links
 Royal Style and Titles Act (R.S.C., 1985, c. R-12)
 Buckingham Palace: The Royal Family: Style and Titles of the Queen

Monarchy in Canada
Canadian